The Sheffield Association League was an English association football league based in Sheffield, South Yorkshire.

History
The league was founded in 1897 to fill the void left by the disbandment of the Sheffield & District Football League, which had run from 1889 to 1895. It soon established itself as the foremost league competition for non-league clubs in the south of Yorkshire. In 1960 the league was renamed the Sheffield & Hallamshire County Senior League. The league was suspended for the duration of the First World War but continued throughout the Second World War.

In 1983 the league merged with the Hatchard League to form a new competition, albeit one which kept the County Senior League name.

Champions

References

 
Sports leagues established in 1897
Football in South Yorkshire
Defunct football leagues in England
Defunct football competitions in South Yorkshire